Michael Wood (born 18 February 1999) is an Australian rugby union player who plays for the NSW Waratahs in Super Rugby AU. His playing position is lock. He was a member of the Queensland Reds squad in 2020, but did not play in a game.

Reference list

External links
Rugby.com.au profile
itsrugby.co.uk profile

1999 births
Australian rugby union players
Living people
Rugby union locks
Queensland Reds players
Queensland Country (NRC team) players
Brisbane City (rugby union) players
New South Wales Waratahs players